The Texas Alliance of Energy Producers ("AEP) is a trade association based in Wichita Falls, Texas. It advocates for members of the petroleum industry in the United States. It represents nearly 3,000 individuals and member companies.

History
Created in 2000 through the merger of the North Texas Oil & Gas Association and the West Central Texas Oil & Gas Association, TAEP has a combined membership of over 3,000 members. TAEP brings together members in 300 cities and 29 states for the common purpose of advocating for the oil and gas industry.

Texas Petro Index
The group is known for creating the Texas Petro Index, a tool that measures the state of the oil economy. The index considers factors such as rig count, employment within the petroleum industry, petroleum prices, and production levels.

Produced Water White Paper
The White Paper provides facts and analysis that can be used by decision-makers, legislators, and voters. The paper highlights produced water management trends, provides examples of recycling and reuse, explores the evolving regulatory and policy framework in Texas, and provides a fact-based analysis of the impediments to improving produced water management.

Key personnel
Chairman

Houston Sullivan is currently the Co-Chief Executive Officer of Veritas, Energy, LLC. Before rejoining Veritas he was Senior Vice President of Business Development of Double Eagle Energy Holdings III LLC and Double Eagle Energy Permian, LLC, a merger between Veritas Energy, LLC and Double Eagle Energy Holdings II. Through these various roles, he has been actively involved in building companies focused on the core of the Midland Basin.

Past Chairman

Cye Wagner of Cooper Oil and Gas is the past Chairman of the TAEP board. Cye has served as the Board Chairman for the past two years. Wagner has worked for over 10 years with Cooper Oil & Gas, Inc.

President

Jason Modglin is the current president since 3 June 2020 who holds a Master of Public Affairs degree from the Lyndon B. Johnson School of Public Affairs at The University of Texas at Austin and a Bachelor of Arts degree from Southwestern University in Georgetown, Texas.

Past President

John Tintera is the past president of the Texas Alliance of Energy Producers.

Past Chairman

References 

Trade associations based in the United States
Wichita Falls, Texas
Petroleum industry in the United States